Brothers from the Walled City is a 1982 Hong Kong film directed by Lam Ngai Kai and produced by the Shaw Brothers Studio.

Cast
 Chin Siu-ho
 Philip Ko Fei
 Johnny Wang Lung Wei
 Liu Lai Ling
 Wong Ching
 Kwan Hoi-san
 Wong Mei Mei
 Lung Tin Sang
 So Hang Suen
 Pak Man Biu

See also
 Kowloon Walled City

References

External links
 IMDb entry

1982 crime drama films
Hong Kong crime drama films
Shaw Brothers Studio films
1982 films
1980s Hong Kong films